Several species of fish share the name red scorpionfish:
Pontinus furcirhinus
Scorpaena scrofa